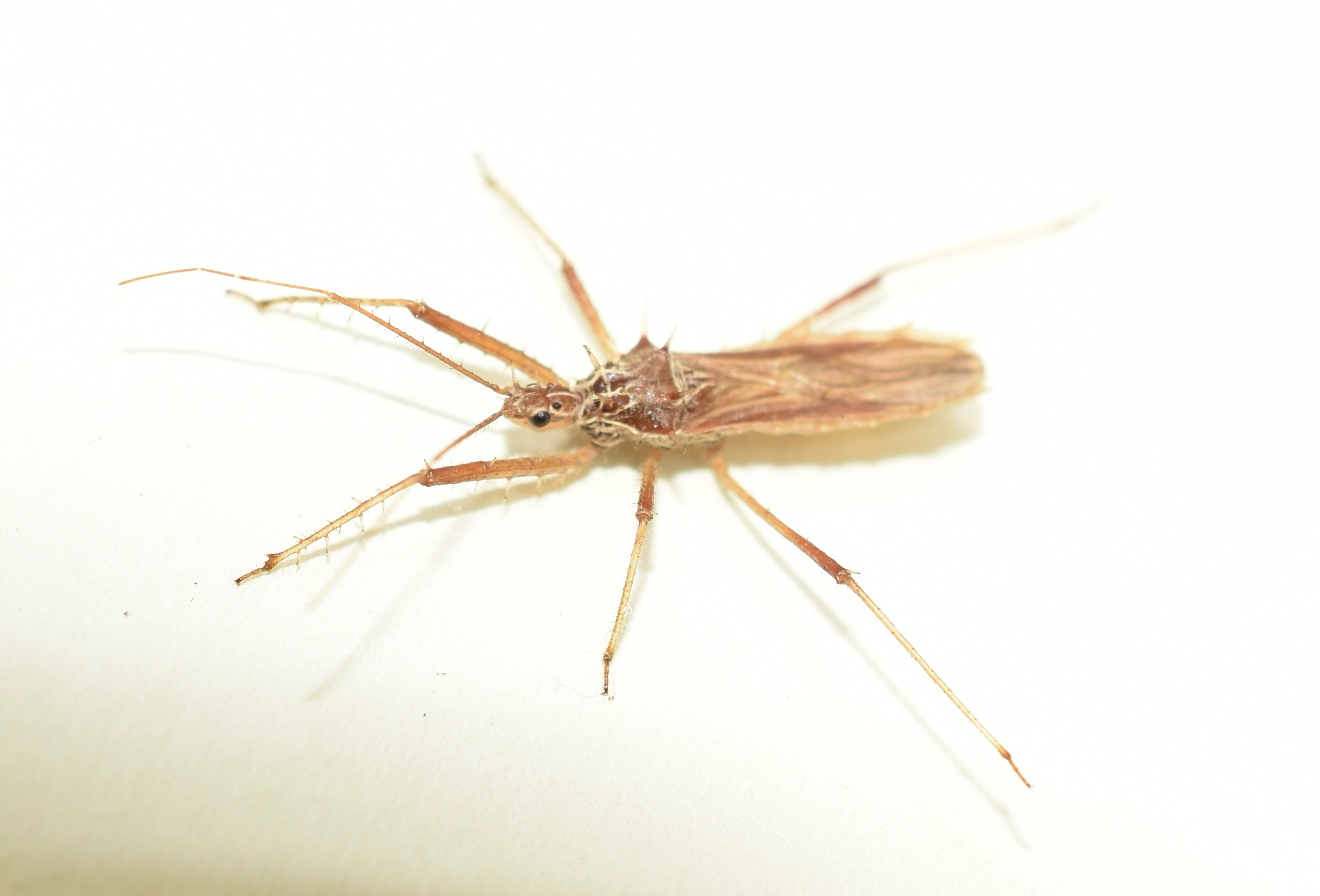

Scientific classification
- Kingdom: Animalia
- Phylum: Arthropoda
- Class: Insecta
- Order: Hemiptera
- Suborder: Heteroptera
- Family: Reduviidae
- Genus: Polididus
- Species: P. armatissimus

Binomial name
- Polididus armatissimus Stål, 1859

= Polididus armatissimus =

Species of true bug

Polididus armatissimus, commonly known as spiny assassin bug, is a species of assassin bug in the family Reduviidae found in Asia.

== Ecology ==
Polididus armatissimus is a winged assassin bug that feeds on insect juices and produces multiple generations each year. It is most active at dawn and dusk and is considered a migratory species. Large numbers are seen from May to July in the north and August to December in the south, with egg-carrying adults frequently attracted to lights.

== Reproduction ==
The species lays straw-yellowish eggs singly, cementing them basally to the substrate, rather than in clusters or glued to fresh excreta. Eggs are elongately cylindrical, slightly convex marginally, with a highly reticulate yellow operculum enveloped by frills of a chorionic collar. The total egg length is 1.4–1.5 mm, width is 0.4–0.5 mm, opercular height is 0.2–0.3 mm, and width is 0.3 mm.

A female lays her first batch of eggs approximately 33–34 days after the imaginal moult. A single female can lay up to 27 batches, with a total of around 101 eggs. The average number of eggs per batch ranges from 1 to 10. The hatching success rate is approximately 88%.

Nymphs hatch in 6–10 days. The five nymphal instars are brown and spinous. The stadial period from first instar to adult ranges from 40–69 days. Nymphal mortality is highest in the first instar (21.6%), primarily due to cannibalism, with other causes including moulting abnormalities and combat with powerful prey.

Adults exhibit sexual dimorphism in longevity: females live 60–100, while males live 50–90 days. The sex ratio in laboratory-raised generations was 1:1 (male:female) in the first generation and 1:3 in the second generation.

== Distribution and habitat ==
This species is native to Asia, with known records from India, Bangladesh, Sri Lanka, Myanmar, Thailand, Malaysia, Cambodia, Laos, Vietnam, China, Taiwan, South Korea, and Japan. It has been introduced to the United States (Hawaii) and is also likely present in South Africa.
